David Keith-Lucas  (25 March 1911 – 6 April 1997) was a British aeronautical engineer.

Early life
David Keith-Lucas was one of the sons of Alys Hubbard Lucas and Keith Lucas, who invented the first aeronautical compass. After the death of Keith Lucas in 1916, his wife Alys changed the family name, and, as Alys Keith-Lucas, edited a short book giving his background together with reminiscences of him and a list of his publications. David Keith-Lucas was educated at Gresham's School, Holt, and at Gonville and Caius College, Cambridge, where he read engineering.

Career
David Keith-Lucas was an apprentice and engineer with C.A. Parsons and Co. from 1933 to 1940, then moved to the aerodynamics office of Short Brothers, Rochester, famous for their flying boats, becoming their chief aerodynamicist in 1944.

From 1945 to 1965 he was with Short Brothers and Harland Ltd in Belfast, holding the posts of chief designer, technical director and research director. His work included research on swept-wings which culminated in the Short SB-5 research aircraft. Other projects included the Short Belfast heavy freighter, the Short Skyvan, and the SD-330 and SD-360 freight-commuter series.

The Short SB.1 was a shoulder-wing, cantilever, tailless monoplane glider designed by David Keith-Lucas and Professor Geoffrey T.R. Hill and built by Shorts as a private research venture to test the concept of the aero-isoclinic wing; it was the first aircraft to incorporate this feature. After initial tests, at the end of which the SB.1 crash-landed as a result of problems while being towed behind the Short Sturgeon, the SB.1 was further developed into the Short SB.4 Sherpa, powered by two Blackburn Turbomeca Palas turbojet engines.

In 1951, Keith-Lucas designed the Short SB-6 Seamew as a lightweight anti-submarine platform.

While in Belfast, he served on the Senate of the Queen's University, Belfast.

In 1965 he was appointed Professor of Aircraft Design at the College of Aeronautics, Cranfield, later the Cranfield Institute of Technology, and welded together the departments of Aerodynamics, Aircraft Design and Flight into a new College of Aeronautics. In 1972, he became its Professor of Aeronautics and also Chairman of the College, which now forms part of Cranfield University.

On retirement in 1976, he was appointed Professor Emeritus and awarded an Honorary Doctorate.

Career in brief
 Chief Aerodynamicist, Short Bros 1940–49
 Chief Designer, Short Bros & Harland Ltd. 1949–58
 Technical Director, Short Bros & Harland Ltd. 1958–64
 Director of Research Short Bros & Harland Ltd. 1964–65
 Member of the Senate of the Queen's University, Belfast, 1960–65
 Professor of Aircraft Design, Cranfield Institute of Technology 1965–72
 Professor of Aeronautics, College of Aeronautics, 1972–76
 Chairman, College of Aeronautics 1972–76

Publications
 The Shape of Wings to Come (1952)

Honours

 President of the Royal Aeronautical Society, 1968
 Doctor of Science Queen's University, Belfast, 1968
 Commander of the Order of the British Empire, 1973
 Honorary Doctorate, Cranfield University, 1976
 Emeritus Professor, College of Aeronautics, 1976
 Gold Medal of the Royal Aeronautical Society, 1975

Other appointments

 Member of the Council of the Air Registration Board, 1967–1972
 Chairman of the Airworthiness Requirements Board, 1972–1982
 Member of the Roskill Commission for the Third London Airport, 1968–1970.

Family

In 1942, Keith-Lucas married firstly Dorothy de Bauduy Robertson, and they had two sons and one daughter. In 1979, he and his wife visited Kitty Hawk, North Carolina, where the Wright brothers had made their flights. His wife was killed there in a road accident, and Keith-Lucas himself was seriously injured. In 1981, he married secondly Phyllis Everard Whurr.

Keith-Lucas's brother, Professor Bryan Keith-Lucas, a political scientist and Master of Darwin College, Kent, died in 1996. He was also the brother of Social Work Professor Alan Keith-Lucas.

Keith-Lucas is the grandfather of BBC weather girl Sarah Keith-Lucas, who did a "Weatherworld" programme on her grandfather's work on the Short SB.4, the prototype of which is now with the Ulster Aviation Society.

Notes

Sources
 Obituary of Professor David Keith-Lucas in The Independent, 29 May 1997
 The Short SB4 at Probertencyclopaedia.com

1911 births
Alumni of Gonville and Caius College, Cambridge
Academics of Cranfield University
People educated at Gresham's School
Commanders of the Order of the British Empire
English aerospace engineers
Fellows of the Royal Aeronautical Society
1997 deaths
20th-century British inventors